Priorwood Garden is a garden in Melrose in the Scottish Borders area of Scotland. The garden contains an apple orchard of unusual apple trees. The flower garden is planted to supply the best samples for dry flower arrangements. It is administered by the National Trust for Scotland.

The National Trust for Scotland has further properties in the Scottish Borders including the nearby Harmony Garden.

See also

List of places in the Scottish Borders
List of places in Scotland

References

External links
 National Trust for Scotland: Priorwood Garden

Gardens in the Scottish Borders
National Trust for Scotland properties
Melrose, Scottish Borders